Profit was a bimonthly Canadian business magazine aimed at entrepreneurs. The headquarters of the magazine is in Toronto.

History and profile
Profit was launched in 1982. The magazine was published bi-monthly until January 1999 when its frequency was switched to eight times a year. It is now published six times per year and, according to its website, it focusses on "how to find opportunity and seize it", management practices, case studies and "access to peer groups". The headquarters of the magazine is in Toronto.

Its sister magazines were Canadian Business and MoneySense. In December 2013 Profit merged with Canadian Business, appearing initially as a special section of that magazine.

References

External links

1982 establishments in Ontario
Business magazines published in Canada
Bi-monthly magazines published in Canada
Eight times annually magazines
Magazines established in 1982
Magazines published in Toronto
Rogers Communications magazines
2013 disestablishments in Ontario
Magazines disestablished in 2013